Somogyvár is a village in Somogy County, Hungary.

Geography
It is situated south from Lengyeltóti, between Lengyeltóti, Öreglak and Somogyvámos.

History 
It is a historical tradition that, after the death of Géza of Hungary, Prince Koppány held this central fortress in the region of Somogyvár.

Koppány launched the attack on the Veszprém fortress in 997 from here.  Archaeological excavations revealed that in 1091 King Ladislaus I of Hungary supported the building of a Benedictine monastery here. Excavations also revealed layers that date from before the 11th century in the Bronze Age.

The Somogyvár Abbey was built between 1091 and 1095 and the first Benedictine monks were invited from the Abbey of Saint-Gilles. Later monks were also invited both from France and other abbeys from Hungary. As so often happened to Benedictine abbeys that were located at important locations, the local kings and princes eventually managed to gain control and convert them from monasteries into military fortresses.

The royal fortress of Somogyvár was frequently mentioned in charters from 1163. Sigismund, Holy Roman Emperor gave the fortress in 1410 to Marczali Miklós. Later, in 1474 the Báthori family received Somogyvár town. Then the Enyingi Török family owned it.

The monastery was used till the Ottoman wars in the 16th century. After the battle of Mohács, it was transformed and rebuilt as a fortress. In 1543 the Ottoman army destroyed the monastery fortress.

After the end of the Turkish wars and occupation, in 1677 Széchenyi György archbishop of Kalocsa rebuilt the village and it became the possession of the Archbishop of Kalocsa until the 20th century.

Archaeological excavations began in 1972 in order to reveal the original remnants of the abbey. The recovered ruins were opened to the public in 1991.

Economy
The Hungarian Fonte Viva company (owned by Mol Group) bottles the local mineral water in the village.

Main sights 
 Ruins of Somogyvár Abbey - consecrated in 1091
 Széchenyi Palace
 Szentesica fountain

Gallery

External links 

 Somogyvár homepage
 About Somogyvár on the Várak homepage
 Somogyvár on the homepage Vendégváró
 Aerial photographs of the ruins of Somogyvár Abbey and the castle
 Falvak.hu
 Street map (Hungarian)

References 

Populated places in Somogy County
Romanesque architecture in Hungary
History of Somogy